The Battle of Nybøl was fought on the 28 May 1848 between the Danish Army and Germans in Sundeved. The Danes were victorious.

References

Bibliography
 Johs. Nielsen, Treårskrigen 1848-1851 1993 
 

Nybøl
Nybøl
Conflicts in 1848
1848 in Denmark
May 1848 events